Oksana Borisovna Kazakova (born 8 April 1975) is a Russian former pair skater. With partner Artur Dmitriev, she is the 1998 Olympic champion and 1996 European champion.

Personal life 
Oksana Borisovna Kazakova was born on 8 April 1975 in Leningrad. Her mother was a kindergarten teacher and her father was in the army. She married Alexei Novitski in the summer of 1996 but divorced him four years later. In 2004, she married Konstantin Kovalenko and gave birth to their daughter, Ksenia, in 2005. They split in 2008.
In 2015, she got married, for the third time, to Juri Kashkarov.

Career 
Kazakova began skating in 1979. In 1982, she was admitted into Saint Petersburg's Yubileyny. She took up pair skating in 1988 and skated with Andrei Mokhov for several years. The pair placed fourth at the 1991 World Junior Championships but split after the event. Kazakova's coaches, Natalia Pavlova and V. Teslia, paired her with Dmitri Sukhanov, with whom she competed for four seasons. Svetlana Korol was their choreographer. The pair finished 15th at the 1993 World Championships and won a pair of medals at the Nations Cup. Their partnership ended after the 1995 Russian Championships.

Kazakova teamed up with Artur Dmitriev in February 1995. Dmitriev was much more experienced, having already competed at two Olympics with Natalia Mishkutenok and won two Olympic medals, gold in 1992 and silver in 1994. Although Mishkutenok decided to retire from competition in 1994, Dmitriev wanted to continue his competitive career and eventually chose Kazakova who also trained in Saint Petersburg. Tamara Moskvina coached them at Yubileyny. Their choreographers were Alexander Matveev, David Avdish, and Moskvina. Early in their partnership, Kazakova and Dmitriev missed six months when she injured her leg. They won the 1996 European Championships and bronze at the 1997 World Championships. In 1998, they won the Olympic title in Nagano, Japan. Kazakova said, "I wanted very much to prove myself and I did." The pair retired from competition but continued to skate in shows.

Kazakova became a coach at Yubileyny Sports Palace, at the club SDUSHOR St. Petersburg, alongside Moskvina. Her former students include Katarina Gerboldt / Alexander Enbert and Kamilla Gainetdinova / Ivan Bich.

Programs 
(with Artur Dmitriev)

Competitive highlights 

CS: Champions Series (later Grand Prix)

With Dmitriev

With Sukhanov

With Mokhov

References

External links

Russian female pair skaters
Olympic figure skaters of Russia
Figure skaters at the 1998 Winter Olympics
Olympic gold medalists for Russia
Living people
Figure skaters from Saint Petersburg
1975 births
Battle of the Blades participants
Olympic medalists in figure skating
World Figure Skating Championships medalists
European Figure Skating Championships medalists
Medalists at the 1998 Winter Olympics
Goodwill Games medalists in figure skating
Competitors at the 1998 Goodwill Games